Renáta Tomanová (born 9 December 1954) is a former professional tennis player from Czechoslovakia.

Career
Tomanová won the girls' singles title at the 1972 French Open.

In 1975, she and Martina Navratilova represented Czechoslovakia in the Federation Cup, the international women's team competition. They won the cup after beating the Australian team 3–0 in the final of the World Group. Between 1975 and 1981, she played in 18 ties for the Czechoslovakian team and compiled a 20–7 win–loss record. In May 1975, she won the singles title at the West German Championships in Hamburg after a three-set final against Kazuko Sawamatsu. In 1976, Tomanová reached the singles final at both the French Open and the Australian Open. She lost at the French Open to Sue Barker 6–2, 0–6, 6–2 and at the Australian Open to Evonne Goolagong 6–2, 6–2. Tomanová also reached the women's doubles final at the Australian Open with Lesley Turner Bowrey, losing to Goolagong and Helen Gourlay Cawley.

In May 1977, she reached the final of the Italian Open, losing to Janet Newberry. In 1978, Tomanová teamed with Betsy Nagelsen to win the women's doubles title at the Australian Open, defeating Naoko Sato and Pam Whytcross in the final 7–5, 6–2. With compatriot Pavel Složil, she won the mixed doubles title at the 1978 French Open.

Tomanová was coached by Věra Suková.

Senior tour
Tomanová is active on the senior tour, and in 2011, she received the Deutsche Tennis Preis from the German tennis federation for her achievements during the 2010 season.

Grand Slam finals

Singles (2 runners-up)

Women's doubles: 2 (1 title, 1 runner-up)

Mixed doubles: 2 (1 title, 1 runner-up)

Grand Slam singles tournament timeline

Note: The Australian Open was held twice in 1977, in January and December.

See also
 Performance timelines for all female tennis players who reached at least one Grand Slam final

References

External links
 
 
 

1954 births
Living people
Australian Open (tennis) champions
Czech female tennis players
Czechoslovak female tennis players
French Open champions
People from Jindřichův Hradec
Grand Slam (tennis) champions in women's doubles
Grand Slam (tennis) champions in mixed doubles
Grand Slam (tennis) champions in girls' singles
Universiade medalists in tennis
Universiade gold medalists for Czechoslovakia
Universiade silver medalists for Czechoslovakia
French Open junior champions
Medalists at the 1977 Summer Universiade
Sportspeople from the South Bohemian Region